Aashiana is a 1974 Bollywood drama film directed by Syed Hussain. The film stars Neetu Singh.

Cast
Neetu Singh
Harindranath Chattopadhyay
Ramesh Deo
Gajanan Jagirdar  (as Jagirdar)
Roopesh Kumar
Sunil Kumar
Rehman

Music
Composer: Hari–Arjun
Lyrics: Yogesh

"Pyaar Pukare Singar Pukare" - Asha Bhosle, Mahendra Kapoor
"Man Mera Tera Jogi Aasha Puri Kab Hogi" - Mohammed Rafi
"Kaisi Mehfil Hai Ye Kaisa Mela Hai" - Mohammed Rafi

External links
 

1974 films
1970s Hindi-language films
1974 drama films
Indian drama films
Hindi-language drama films